Sacoproteus is a genus of sea slugs in the Limapontiidae family, described in 2018. It contains five species, of which four were newly described when the genus was erected, and one (Sacoproteus smaragdinus) was reassigned from its previous classification of Stiliger smaragdinus as the type species of the new genus. Most of the species are mimetic of toxic "sea-grape" algae in the genus Caulerpa.

Species
The species of the genus were found to closely mimic the appearance of different types of toxic algae that they feed on.
Sacoproteus smaragdinus (previously classified as Stiliger smaragdinus): mimics Caulerpa racemosa and Caulerpa lentilifera
Sacoproteus nishae: mimics Caulerpa chemnitzia
Sacoproteus yhiae: mimics Caulerpa cactoides and Caulerpa gemminata
Sacoproteus browni: probably as S. yhiae
Sacoproteus thomasleei: not mimetic

References

Limapontiidae
Mimicry